Endoxyla is a genus of fungi within the Boliniaceae family.

Species
As accepted by Species Fungorum;

Endoxyla avocetta  (1991)
Endoxyla capparis  (1972)

Endoxyla excelsior  (1965)

Endoxyla mallochii  (2013)

Endoxyla munkii  (1993)
Endoxyla occulta  (2013)
Endoxyla operculata  (1882)
Endoxyla parallela  (1882)

Endoxyla xanthostroma  (1993)

Former species;
 E. cirrhosa  = Lentomitella cirrhosa, Lentomitellaceae
 E. eutypoides  = Eutypa eutypoides, Diatrypaceae
 E. fraxini  = Cryptosphaeria eunomia, Diatrypaceae
 E. hyalostoma  = Ceratostomella hyalostoma, Boliniaceae
 E. laevirostris  = Natantiella ligneola, Sordariomycetes
 E. luteobasis  = Endoxylina luteobasis, Sordariomycetes
 E. rostrata  = Ceratostomella rostrata, Boliniaceae
 E. vestita  = Lentomitella cirrhosa, Lentomitellaceae

References

External links
Index Fungorum

Sordariomycetes genera
Boliniales